John Ronaldson (born 1 October 1946) is a former Australian rules football player who played in the VFL between 1965 and 1970 for the Richmond Football Club.

Ronaldson is the father of Australian basketballer Tony Ronaldson.

References 
 Hogan P: The Tigers Of Old, Richmond FC, Melbourne 1996

External links
 
 

1946 births
Living people
Richmond Football Club players
Richmond Football Club Premiership players
Australian rules footballers from Victoria (Australia)
Two-time VFL/AFL Premiership players